Victor Guilherme Massaia (born 9 February 1992) is a Brazilian footballer who plays as a centre-back.

Club career
He made his professional debut in the Segunda Liga for Sporting Covilhã on 21 August 2013 in a game against Tondela. He made his Primeira Liga debut for Chaves on 18 February 2017, when he played the whole game in a 2–0 victory over Arouca.

On 1 September 2021, Victor Massaia signed for II liga club Motor Lublin. After suffering a major knee injury a few weeks after joining Motor, he failed to make an appearance before requesting his contract to be terminated on 2 March 2022.

References

External links

1992 births
Living people
Brazilian footballers
Brazilian expatriate footballers
Brazilian expatriate sportspeople in Portugal
Brazilian expatriate sportspeople in Poland
Expatriate footballers in Portugal
Expatriate footballers in Poland
Primeira Liga players
Liga Portugal 2 players
Goiás Esporte Clube players
Associação Atlética Aparecidense players
S.C. Covilhã players
C.D. Santa Clara players
G.D. Chaves players
F.C. Arouca players
C.D. Cova da Piedade players
Motor Lublin players
Association football defenders